Rehman (23 June 1921 – 5 November 1984) was an Indian actor whose career spanned from the late 1940s through to the late 1970s. He was an integral part of the Guru Dutt team, and most known for his roles in films such as Pyar Ki Jeet (1948), Badi Behen (1949), Pardes (1950), Pyaasa (1957), Choti Behen (1959), Chaudhvin Ka Chand (1960), Sahib Bibi Aur Ghulam (1962), Dil Ne Phir Yaad Kiya (1966) and Waqt (1965).

Early life and education
Said Rehman Khan was an actor in Hindi and Indian films. He was born on 23 June 1921 in Lahore, Punjab Province, British India (now in Punjab, Pakistan) into the royal Mohammadzai clan of the Barakzai tribe of the Durrani confederacy of Pashtuns. His Afghan ancestors moved to Punjab, India from Kabul, Afghanistan in 1905 during the British Raj. His family claims ancestry from king Amanullah Khan of Paghman and from founder of the Durrani Empire and the modern state of Afghanistan, Ahmad Shah Abdali of Herat. He graduated from Robertson College Jabalpur, staying in BeoharNiwas Palace. Among his nephews are prominent Pakistani film and TV actor Faisal Rehman and Fasih Ur Rehman, Indian classical dancer, and sons of his younger brother Massud-ur-Rehman, the famous cinematographer in Pakistan.

Film career
After college (1942), he joined the Royal Indian Air Force and trained at Poona as a pilot. The Air Force didn't appeal to him and soon left for a career in films at Bombay. He is best known for his suave sophisticated roles, which suited his personality.
His movie career started with a job as third assistant director to Vishram Bedekar at the studios in Pune. Vishram needed an Afghan who could tie a Pashtun turban on one of his characters. Rehman could do that, being a Pashtun, and that brought him to the screen for some lead roles. One of his major hits as hero was Pyar Ki Jeet with Suraiya, and the song-"Ek Dil Ke Tukade Hazar Hue, Koi Yahan Gira, Koi Wahan Gira" was a major hit. Badi Behen was another big hit with Suraiya. He was also interested in marrying Suraiya, along with many other suitors, though she was adamant in wanting to marry Dev Anand. He also worked with Madhubala in Paras (1949) and Pardes (1950); both the films were critical and commercial successes.

Initially he played lead roles, but as time passed, he accepted supporting roles and made his mark in some hit films like  Pyaasa, Chaudhvin Ka Chand and Sahib Bibi Aur Ghulam (in which he played a debauched zamindar, Chhote Sarkar), and Waqt which were some of his memorable roles, the first two with Guru Dutt, famous actor, producer, director. Rehman also did key roles in Baharon Ki Manzil, Gomti Ke Kinare, Dushman and Holi Aayi Re. Rehman received four Filmfare nominations as Best Supporting Actor for Phir Subah Hogi (1958), Chaudhvin Ka Chand (1960), Sahib Bibi Aur Ghulam (1962) and Dil Ne Phir Yaad Kiya (1966).

Death
In 1977, he suffered three heart attacks due to excessive alcohol consumption. He was also a chain smoker and he was diagnosed with throat cancer. A man whose majestic voice was his signature, lost his voice and he was unable to speak during his last days in his life. Rehman died in 1984.

Selected filmography

 Chand (1944)
 Hum Ek Hain (1946)
 Shahjehan (1946)
 Nargis (1946)
 Tohfa (1947)
 Intezar Ke Baad (1947)
 Roop Rekha (1948)
 Pyar Ki Jeet (1948)
 Roomal (1949)
 Paras (1949)
 Badi Bahen (1949)
 Pardes (1950)
 Pyaasa (1957)
 Phir Subah Hogi (1958)
 Choti Bahen(1959)
 Chhalia (1960)
 Chaudhvin Ka Chand (1960)
 Ghunghat (1960)
 Dharmputra (1961)
 Sahib Bibi Aur Ghulam (1962)
 Mere Mehboob (1963)
 Taj Mahal (1963)
 Yeh Rastey Hain Pyar Ke (1963)
 Ganga Ki Lahren (1964)
 Gazal (1964)
 Waqt (1965)
Baharen Phir Bhi Aayengi (1966)
Dil Ne Phir Yaad Kiya (1966)
Dil Diya Dard Liya (1966)
 Noor Jehan (1967)
Palki (1967)
Dulhan Ek Raat Ki (1967)
Aabroo (1968)
Abhilasha (1968)
Humsaya (1968)
Mere Hamdam Mere Dost (1968)
Shikar (1968)
Intaquam (1969)
Mastana (1970)
Devi (1970)
Darpan (1970)
Chingari (1971 film)
Dushman (1971)
Heera Panna (1973)
Majboor (1974)
Dost (1974)
Aap Ki Kasam (1974)
Aandhi (1975)
Chacha Bhatija (1977)
 Salaam Memsaab (1979)
 Sanjh Ki Bela (1980)
 Dhanwan (1981)
 Ahista Ahista (1981)
 Vakil Babu (1982)
 Rajput (1982)
 Dil ... Aakhir Dil Hai (1982)

References

External links
 
 Rehman (1921–1979)
 Faisal Rehman Interview

1921 births
1984 deaths
Indian people of Afghan descent
Pashtun people
Indian people of Pashtun descent
Indian male film actors
Deaths from laryngeal cancer
Male actors in Hindi cinema
Male actors from Lahore
20th-century Indian male actors
Filmfare Awards winners